Mahmoud Amnah (born 3 January 1983 in Aleppo) is a Syrian footballer who plays as a midfielder. He has earned 80 caps for the Syria national team between 2002 and 2011, scoring 20 goals. He last played for Calcutta Football League side Southern Samity.

International career
Amnah had been a regular for the Syria national football team from 2002 to 2011. He made 10 appearances for Syria during the qualifying rounds of the 2006 and the 2010 FIFA World Cup.

Club career
- Played for the first team in the club horaya in 2001

- And in 2002 achieved a fourth place with Club el horaya

- And in 2003 he moved for the ittihad club in the most expensive deal in the history of the Syrian ball at this time Ittihad club is most famous club in Syria

- And in 2004 achieved a league and cup double with Syria's Al Ittihad.

- And in 2005 achieve the Cup of the Republic of Syria.

- And third place in 2006 and participated in the Asian Championship with the club.

- 2007 and the cup and Syrian participation in the Asian Club Championship.

- 2008 shared in Asian champion league

- in 2009 to 2012 played in Iranian super league with Rah Ahn team in Tehran

-2012-2013 played with Iraqi super league in sulimanaya team in Kurdistan of Iraq

2013-2014 went to play in Malaysian super league With sime darby fc Achieve the fifth place in the league

Number of games in the Syrian league 250 games

Number of games in the Iranian league 80 games

Number of games in Iraqi league 33 games

Number of games in Malaysian league 24 games.
He played for the best club in India,i.e. East Bengal and played a pivotal role for their 8th consecutive CFL triumph. He was the best player of that season for the red and gold brigade.

Career statistics

Club career statistics

 Assist Goals

Goals for senior national team
Scores and results table. Syria's goal tally first:

Honours

Al-Ittihad
 Syrian Premier League: 2005
 Syrian Cup: 2005, 2006
Aizawl
I-League: 2016–17
East Bengal
Calcutta Football League: 2017

Syria
 WAFF Championship runner-up: 2004
 West Asian Games runner-up: 2005
 Nehru Cup runner-up: 2007

Individual
 East Bengal "Player of the Season Award": 2017

References

External links
 
 
 

1983 births
Living people
People from Aleppo
Sportspeople from Aleppo
Syrian footballers
Association football midfielders
Syria international footballers
Syrian expatriate footballers
Expatriate footballers in Iran
Syrian expatriate sportspeople in Iran
Expatriate footballers in Iraq
Syrian expatriate sportspeople in Iraq
Hurriya SC players
Al-Ittihad Aleppo players
Rah Ahan players
Expatriate footballers in Malaysia
Syrian expatriate sportspeople in Malaysia
Malaysia Super League players
Footballers at the 2006 Asian Games
Asian Games competitors for Syria
Syrian Premier League players
Calcutta Football League players